Camiri Airport ,  is an airport serving Camiri, a city in the Santa Cruz Department of Bolivia.

The airport is just north of the city. Camiri is in a fold valley of the Cordillera Central mountain range, and there is nearby mountainous terrain east and west of the airport.

The Camiri non-directional beacon (Ident: CAM) is located on the field.

See also

Transport in Bolivia
List of airports in Bolivia

References

External links 
OpenStreetMap - Camiri
OurAirports - Camiri
SkyVector - Camiri

Airports in Santa Cruz Department (Bolivia)